Thor Peak is a  mountain summit located east of the crest of the Sierra Nevada mountain range in Inyo County, California. It is situated in the John Muir Wilderness on land managed by Inyo National Forest. Hikers on the Mount Whitney Trail pass below the impressive south face of the peak.

Climate
According to the Köppen climate classification system, Thor Peak has an alpine climate. Most weather fronts originate in the Pacific Ocean, and travel east toward the Sierra Nevada mountains. As fronts approach, they are forced upward by the peaks, causing them to drop their moisture in the form of rain or snowfall onto the range (orographic lift). Precipitation runoff from this mountain drains east to Owens Valley via Lone Pine Creek.

Climbing
The first ascent of the summit was made by Norman Clyde, date unknown.

Established rock climbing routes:

 Southwest side –  – First ascent by Norman Clyde
 West Arête – class 2
 Southeast chimney, aka Stemwinder – class 5.4 – FA 1936, by Glen Dawson, Robert K. Brinton, William Rice
 South face – class 5 – FA 1937, by Howard Koster, Arthur B. Johnson, James N. Smith
 Odin’s Wrath – class 5.10d

Gallery

See also

 List of mountain peaks of California

References

External links
 Weather forecast: Thor Peak
 Thor Peak climbing: Mountainproject.com

Inyo National Forest
Mountains of Inyo County, California
North American 3000 m summits
Mountains of Northern California
Sierra Nevada (United States)
Mountains of the John Muir Wilderness